Ballyheigue, officially Ballyheige ( - meaning Settlement of Tadhg) is a coastal village in County Kerry, Ireland. It is a scenic locale which forms part of the Wild Atlantic Way and has many miles of beaches that connect to Banna Strand to the south, and Kerry Head to the north. It has an active community who run many events throughout the year including the Half on the Head (Kerryhead Half Marathon) in June and an annual summer festival in July.

Notable people
Richard Cantillon, economic theorist and coiner of the term entrepreneur.
Don O'Neill, fashion designer.

See also
 List of towns and villages in Ireland

Further reading

The Story of Ballyheigue, by Bryan MacMahon, published by Oidhreacht, Ballyheigue, County Kerry, May 1994 
The Crosbie Papers, including manuscripts relating to the Danish Silver Raid, in documents of the Estate of John Viscount Crosbie, NLI MS 5033, National Library of Ireland, Kildare Street, Dublin.
New Light on The Golden Lion and the Danish Silver Robbery at Ballyheigue, by B. Mac Mahon, published in the Journal of the Kerry Archaeological and Historical Society. Vol: 24 pp:113-149, 1991. Abstract: This article examines the robbery in 1731 of six chests of silver, part of the cargo of the 'Golden Lion' which was driven ashore at Ballyheigue during the previous year.
The Lively Ghosts of Ireland, by Hans Holzer, Wolfe Publishing Ltd., London, 1967, 1968, reprinted 1970. See Chapter on Ballyheigue, page 32, recalling earlier article in 1962 by Patrick Denis O'Donnell in Ireland of the Welcomes.
North London Recording and Rehearsal Studios "Bally Studios", used by The Kinks, Coldplay, Snow Patrol and Shane MacGowan & The Popes and Bernard Butler(Suede) got its name from Ballyheigue, as the manager's family is originally from the village.

References

External links
Ballyheigue Website 
Ballyheigue Info Page
 Map of Ballyheigue & its townlands

Towns and villages in County Kerry
Beaches of County Kerry